The Making of ‘…and God Spoke’ is a 1993 mockumentary about the production of a film based on the Bible that follows a producer and director through the various stages of making a $15 million-dollar Hollywood film.

Plot
The film follows a film production from pre-production to its  release. The cast and crew have to deal with a variety of problems including a Noah's Ark that is too big, an Eve with a tattoo, and a Moses who promotes Coca-Cola alongside the Ten Commandments.

References

External links
 
 
 

American mockumentary films
1990s English-language films
1990s American films

1993 comedy films
1993 films